On 4 January 2013, a Britten-Norman Islander light passenger aircraft operated by Transaereo 5074 crashed during a domestic flight from Los Roques Airport, on the Los Roques archipelago, to Caracas, Venezuela, killing all six people on board. Among the victims was Italian fashion entrepreneur Vittorio Missoni.

Discovery of the wreckage 
On 27 June 2013, the Deep Sea oceanographic ship confirmed that the missing aircraft had been found in the Caribbean, north of the Los Roques archipelago.

Victims
Among the victims were Italian fashion entrepreneur Vittorio Missoni and his wife, who were on holiday in Los Roques.

Investigation
During the course of the investigation, it emerged that the pilot had an expired medical certificate and the airline had not yet received the authorization to operate. In a statement from Asdrubal Bermudez, president and owner of the company Transaereo 5074, even though the airline was unable to fly, the plane involved in the incident had met all safety certifications and was allowed to fly.

References

Aviation accidents and incidents in 2013
Accidents and incidents involving the Britten-Norman Islander
January 2013 events in South America
2013 in Venezuela
Aviation accidents and incidents in Venezuela
2013 disasters in Venezuela